Ray Chamberlain (born 5 September 1976), better known as Razor Ray, is an Australian rules football field umpire in the Australian Football League. 

Chamberlain was born and grew up in the Australian Capital Territory and umpired his first Australian rules game as a teenager. He was offered an umpiring contract by the VFL in 2000 and promptly moved to Victoria, where he umpired in the VFL for four years before being offered an AFL umpiring contract. Chamberlain is noted for his sense of humour, often cracking jokes on the field. Chamberlain has been criticised by individuals such as coach of  Chris Scott for a perceived lack of ability to perform a centre bounce, claims that Chamberlain has pushed back against.

He formerly taught physical education at Victorian Public High School, Mordialloc College, where he was also a year-level coordinator.

Inaugural inductee to University of Canberra Sport Walk of Fame in 2022.

Footnotes

Australian Football League umpires
1976 births
Living people
University of Canberra alumni